Triaxomera is a genus of the fungus moth family, Tineidae. Therein, it belongs to the subfamily Nemapogoninae.

Seven species presently placed in Triaxomera:
 Triaxomera baldensis G.Petersen, 1983
 Triaxomera caucasiella Zagulajev, 1959
 Triaxomera fulvimitrella (Sodoffsky 1830) (= T. bohemanella, T. kroesmanni)
 Triaxomera kurilensis (Zagulajev, 1996)
 Triaxomera marsica G.Petersen, 1984
 Triaxomera parasitella
 Triaxomera puncticulata Miyamoto, Hirowatari & Yamamoto, 2002

Footnotes

References

  (2004): Butterflies and Moths of the World, Generic Names and their Type-species – Triaxomera. Version of 2004-NOV-05. Retrieved 2010-MAY-05.
  [2010]: Global Taxonomic Database of Tineidae (Lepidoptera). Retrieved 2010-MAY-05.

Nemapogoninae
Taxa named by Aleksei Konstantinovich Zagulyaev